"Lift Me Up" is a song by French DJ and producer David Guetta from his sixth studio album Listen. It features vocals in English from Norwegian duo Nico & Vinz, and South African choral group Ladysmith Black Mambazo. Ladysmith Black Mambazo sing in Zulu on the bridge, and also provide additional vocals before the drop. It is the only track on the album to feature a language other than English. The song is inspirational, which features lyrics of the protagonist trying to tell his lover to help him make the world a better place. It has charted in France.

Charts

References

2014 songs
Songs written by David Guetta
Songs written by Giorgio Tuinfort
Songs written by Julie Frost
David Guetta songs
Nico & Vinz songs
Song recordings produced by David Guetta